= Victory Games =

Victory Games may refer to:

- Victory Games (Avalon Hill) (1982–1991), an American board game developer, a subsidiary of Avalon Hill Games
- Victory Games (EA) (2012–2013), an American video game developer, a subsidiary of Electronic Arts
